Katri "Kati" Läike (born 22 August 1967) is a Finnish sailor. She competed in the women's 470 event at the 1992 Summer Olympics. Läike emigrated to New Zealand in 1993, and she has represented New Zealand in cycling competitions.

References

External links
 

1967 births
Living people
Finnish female sailors (sport)
Olympic sailors of Finland
Sailors at the 1992 Summer Olympics – 470
Sportspeople from Turku
Finnish emigrants to New Zealand
Naturalised citizens of New Zealand
New Zealand female cyclists
New Zealand people of Finnish descent